American Accrediting Association of Theological Institutions (AAATI) is a Christian nonprofit organization based in Rocky Mount, North Carolina. It was founded by Cecil Johnson, president of Christian Bible College, a distance education Bible college based in Rocky Mount North Carolina.

Many institutions hold accreditation through various accrediting associations to appeal to a broader set of students.  While seeking to provide a semblance of accountability for religious training institutions, AAATI is not recognized as an accreditor by either the United States Department of Education or the Council for Higher Education Accreditation.

History
AAATI was started in 1983. It is operated by Cecil Johnson, president of Christian Bible College, a distance education Bible college based in Rocky Mount that Steve Levicoff identifies as a diploma mill. In 1993, Levicoff wrote that AAATI gave accreditation for a $100 fee with no educational requirements (a $75.00 a renewal fee each year), and described it as a meaningless accreditation because it was not recognized by the Federal Government.

Accreditation program
Therapon University, one of the schools with AAATI accreditation, describes accreditation by AAATI as "religious accreditation, rather than secular". Therapon states that AAATI "monitors educational and religious standards for Bible colleges", providing accreditation that is "accepted by many religious organizations" but may not be accepted by employers or other educational institutions because AAATI lacks U.S. Department of Education recognition.

Christian Bible College
Like many secular schools are now offering, some of the AAATI accredited schools offer a limited amount of "life experience" credit toward degrees.

Alumni of Christian Bible College, one of the AAATI accredited schools include Chuck Baldwin, founder and former pastor of Crossroad Baptist Church in Pensacola, Florida, and the Constitution Party's nominee for president in 2008 and vice president in 2004.

Affiliated institutions
Institutions that have claimed membership in, or accreditation from, the AAATI include:

 Alpha Omega Bible College & Seminary Inc., Elkton, South Dakota
 Christian Bible College, Rocky Mount, North Carolina
 International Institute of Church Management Inc., based in Plymouth, Pennsylvania, USA, and Chennai, India
 Liberty Bible College and Seminary
 National Chaplains Institute's Biblical Life College and Seminary
 Pacific International University
 Patriot Bible University, Del Norte, Colorado
 Slidell Baptist Seminary
 Shalom Bible College & Seminary, West Des Moines, Iowa
 Therapon University, St. Thomas, U.S. Virgin Islands
 White Horse School of Ministry, West Lafayette, Indiana
 Zion Ministerial Institute

See also

List of unaccredited institutions of higher learning
List of unrecognized accreditation associations of higher learning

References

External links
Christian Bible College (Same operator as American Accrediting Association of Theological Institutions)

Unrecognized accreditation associations
Organizations established in 1983
1983 establishments in North Carolina